Antonio Jiménez may refer to:

 Antonio Jiménez Manjón (1866–1919), Spanish composer
 Antonio Jiménez (baseball), Cuban baseball player, see Industriales
 Antonio David Jiménez (born 1977), Spanish steeple chase runner
 Toni Jiménez (born 1970), Spanish soccer player
 Antonio Jiménez Quiles